Floreat Athena completed the league season undefeated, the first time that had occurred since 1990 (when Floreat also had an undefeated league season).

Pre-season changes

Table

References

2007
2007 in Australian soccer